This is a list of parliamentary by-elections in the United Kingdom held between 1931 and 1950, with the names of the incumbent and victor and their respective parties. Where seats changed political party at the election, the result is highlighted: red for a Labour gain, blue for a Conservative gain, orange for a Liberal gain, yellow for an SNP gain and grey for any other gain. A grand total of 333 by-elections were held during this period.

Resignations 

Where the cause of by-election is given as "resignation" or "seeks re-election", this indicates that the incumbent was appointed on his or her own request to an "office of profit under the Crown", either the Steward of the Chiltern Hundreds or the Steward of the Manor of Northstead. These appointments are made as a constitutional device for leaving the House of Commons, whose Members are not permitted to resign.

By-elections

References

Bibliography
British Parliamentary By-Elections since 1945

F. W. S. Craig, British Parliamentary Election Statistics 1832-1987
F. W. S. Craig, British Parliamentary Election Results 1918-49
F. W. S. Craig, Chronology of British Parliamentary By-elections 1833-1987

1931
20th century in the United Kingdom